Sakeng is a community council located in the Mokhotlong District of Lesotho. Its population in 2006 was 2,850.

Villages
The community of Sakeng includes the villages of Ha Liphate, Ha Mojakisane, Ha Mokone, Ha Mpiti,  Ha Senepi, Ha Thamane, Khohloaneng, Khohlong, Khohlong (Ha Mokone), Kokomala, Liphakoeng, Maboloka, Malakabeng, Manyofaneng, Mapeleng and Thoteng.

References

External links
 Google map of community villages

Populated places in Mokhotlong District